Christoph Kneip (born 7 January 1980) is a German épée fencer, team silver medallist in the 2003 World Championships, and team bronze medallist in the 2010 European Championships.

References
 Profile at the German Fencing Federation
 Profile at the European Fencing Confederation

1980 births
Living people
German épée fencers
German male fencers
21st-century German people